Patricia Ann Seitz (born 1946) is a senior United States district judge of the United States District Court for the Southern District of Florida.

Education and career

Seitz was born in Washington, D.C., in 1946.  Her father is Lieutenant General Richard J. Seitz, former commanding general of the 82nd Airborne Division and the XVIII Airborne Corps. She graduated from Kansas State University with a Bachelor of Arts degree in 1968, and from Georgetown University Law Center with a Juris Doctor in 1973. Seitz was a law clerk for Judge Charles Richey of the United States District Court for the District of Columbia from  1973 to 1974. She was in private practice in Florida from 1974 to 1996, and was a part-time adjunct professor at the University of Miami from 1984 to 1988. Seitz served as president of the Florida Bar from 1993 to 1994; she was the first woman to hold that position. She served at director of the Office of Legal Counsel for the Office of National Drug Control Policy (part of the Executive Office of the President) from 1996 to 1997, during the Bill Clinton administration.

Federal judicial service

President Clinton nominated Seitz to the United States District Court for the Southern District of Florida on May 22, 1998, to the seat vacated by Stanley Marcus. Confirmed by the Senate on September 28, 1998, she received commission on October 1, 1998. She took senior status on November 16, 2012.

References

External links

1946 births
Living people
Judges of the United States District Court for the Southern District of Florida
United States district court judges appointed by Bill Clinton
Kansas State University alumni
Georgetown University Law Center alumni
People from Washington, D.C.
20th-century American judges
21st-century American judges
20th-century American women judges
21st-century American women judges